John Francis Lewis (March 1, 1818September 2, 1895) was an American planter and politician from Rockingham County, Virginia. He served two terms as the ninth and 14th Lieutenant Governor of Virginia and represented Virginia as a Republican in the United States Senate during the Reconstruction period after the Civil War.

Biography
John F. Lewis was born on the "Lynnwood" plantation in rural Rockingham County, Virginia, a son of Samuel Hance Lewis (1794–1869) and Nancy Cameron Lewis (1795–1841). He attended an old field school and engaged in agricultural pursuits as a young adult. He married Serena Helen Sheffey (1823–1901) in October 1842, and they raised six children.

He was a delegate to the Virginia secession convention in 1861, but refused to sign the ordinance of secession. He was the only member from east of the Allegheny Mountains that refused to endorse the document.

During the Civil War, portions of the Battle of Port Republic were fought on his family's land.

Lewis was an unsuccessful Union Party candidate for Congress in 1865. He was elected as Virginia's lieutenant governor in 1869 and served from October 5 of that year until January 1, 1870. Upon the readmission of Virginia to representation in the U.S. Congress, Lewis was elected as a Republican to the United States Senate and served from January 26, 1870, to March 4, 1875. He served on the Committee on the District of Columbia in the Forty-third Congress. He was not a candidate for reelection as the Republicans had already become a minority party by 1874 and wouldn't control either house on their own in Virginia for the rest of the 19th century.

He returned home and was appointed by Presidents Ulysses S. Grant and Rutherford B. Hayes as the United States Marshal for the western district of Virginia 1875-1882, when he resigned. Lewis was again elected lieutenant governor in 1881, alongside Readjuster Party candidate William E. Cameron, and served with him from 1882 to 1886. After his term, no Republican served as Virginia's lieutenant governor until John N. Dalton served from 1974 to 1978.

He retired from politics after his term and resumed his agricultural pursuits. He died at Lynnwood in Rockingham County, Virginia. He was buried in the family burial ground on the plantation.

References

External links

 New York Times, obituary for John F. Lewis, September 3, 1895
 Biographic sketch at U.S. Congress website
 Encyclopedia Virginia entry on the Lieutenant Governorship

1818 births
1895 deaths
People from Rockingham County, Virginia
American people of Welsh descent
Republican Party United States senators from Virginia
Virginia Republicans
Lieutenant Governors of Virginia
Virginia Secession Delegates of 1861
United States Marshals
American planters
People of Virginia in the American Civil War
Southern Unionists in the American Civil War